Anthony Di Lallo (born 14 September 1988) is a Belgian footballer who plays for Sporting Hasselt.

References

External links

1988 births
Living people
Belgian footballers
Belgian expatriate footballers
K.S.V. Roeselare players
MVV Maastricht players
Fortuna Sittard players
Royal Antwerp F.C. players
Association football forwards
Belgian Pro League players
Challenger Pro League players
Eerste Divisie players
Expatriate footballers in the Netherlands
People from Huy
Footballers from Liège Province